Gordon Robinson (12 April 1888 – 1 November 1969) was an Australian rules footballer who played with St Kilda in the Victorian Football League (VFL).

Notes

External links 

1888 births
1969 deaths
Australian rules footballers from Melbourne
St Kilda Football Club players
Brighton Football Club players
People from Brighton, Victoria